Hyesan is a city in the northern part of Ryanggang province of North Korea. It is a hub of river transportation as well as a product distribution centre. It is also the administrative centre of Ryanggang Province. As of 2008, the population of the city is 192,680.

Area 
Around the 1940s, this city included the nearby Paektu Mountains. However, due to several changes, the area of this city was reduced, and now it only includes the nearby Yalu River.

Due to the reunification matter with South Korea, this city is claimed by South Korea, following the boundaries of 1940s, not the one edited by North Korea. Therefore, according to South Korea, Hyesan still includes the nearby Paektu Mountains.

South Korea has a conflict with the People's Republic of China because of the Baekdu Mountains. The mountain is actually divided in two: the south parts are ruled by North Korea while the north parts are ruled by the PRC. However, South Korea still claims the northern parts. It is not officially claimed, but on maps printed by South Korea, it is de facto claimed. The Republic of China claims the entire mountain.

Geography 
The city is located in the Paektu Mountains at the border with the People's Republic of China (Jilin province), from which it is separated by the Yalu (Amrok) River. Changbai is the closest Chinese city across the river.

Climate
Hyesan has an elevation-influenced humid continental climate (Köppen climate classification Dwb).

Administrative divisions
Hyesan City is divided into 25 tong (neighbourhoods) and 4 ri (villages):

Economy 

Hyesan has lumber processing mills, paper mills and textile mills. Since the North Korean economic crisis that intensified in the mid-1990s, the city has suffered from economic stagnation, and some factories in the city have closed. Reports and pictures taken from the Chinese side of the river show a "Ghost City": there is almost no movement in the streets, and at night the city is dark and doesn't have electricity. Residents of the city reputedly wash their clothes in the river because homes have no running water.

First explored in the 1960s, Hyesan mine produces 10,000 tons of copper concentrates annually. This area has 80% of North Korea's available copper, and the North had estimated that it will be able to continue mining copper there for the next forty years. When Kapsan Tongjum Mine, explored during the Japanese colonial period, was finally depleted and closed in 1990, Hyesan Mine became the lifeline of the nation's copper production. At that time, the mine flooded because the pumping device stopped operating due to the lack of electricity across the country. Although the workers at the mine did their best to pump the water, they could not stop the water flowing into the mine at a speed of 480m3/hour. In 1996, during the North's 'Arduous March', electricity was not provided to the mine, leading to flooding in the mineshafts in January 1997. Hyesan Mine flooded again, as did other mines throughout the country, and lost all mining facilities. Since 1998, Kim Jong Il budgeted 8.2 million USD to dewater the mine, and the mine was recovered using electricity and equipment provided by China.

Transportation 
Hyesan is connected to other cities in North Korea by road, and by the Paektusan Ch'ŏngnyŏn and Pukbunaeryuk lines of the Korean State Railway.

Hyesan allegedly has a trolleybus system, though its actual existence is unknown.

Education 
Schools in Hyesan include Hyesan High School and Hyesan Girls' School. Higher education institutions include the Hyesan Medical University, the Hyesan University of Agriculture and Forestry, Kim Jŏng-suk College of Education, the Hyesan College of Light Engineering, and the Hyesan University of Industry.

The countryside near Hyesan has various attractions, including the Kwaegung Pavilion, Naegŏk Hot Spring and Mount Paektu.

Notable people 
 Yeonmi Park (b. 1993), activist and defector, escaped North Korea in 2007.
 Lee Hyeon-seo (b. 1980), activist and defector, escaped North Korea in 1997.

See also

 List of cities in North Korea
 Administrative divisions of North Korea
 Changbai–Hyesan International Bridge

References

Further reading
Dormels, Rainer. North Korea's Cities: Industrial facilities, internal structures and typification. Jimoondang, 2014.

External links

North Korea Uncovered, (North Korea Google Earth) see most of Hyesan's political and industrial infrastructure on Google Earth.
Maps and satellite images of Hyesan Airfield
City profile of Hyesan 

Cities in Ryanggang